"Sticks" is a short story by horror fiction writer Karl Edward Wagner, first published in the March 1974 issue of Whispers. It has been reprinted in several anthologies, including the revised edition of Tales of the Cthulhu Mythos, indicating that it is part of the Cthulhu Mythos genre.

While on a fishing trip in the Adirondack Mountains, horror illustrator Colin Leverett encounters an old abandoned house surrounded by bizarre stick formations. Enthusiastically sketching the strange constructions, he enters the house and is attacked by a lich in the basement, from whom he narrowly escapes. Many years later, Leverett is contacted by a descendant of a famous horror author, H. Kenneth Allard (supposedly based on H.P. Lovecraft), who hires him to illustrate a volume of Allard's previously unpublished stories. When Leverett decides to base the illustrations on his old sketches of the stick lattices, he is unwittingly drawn into a supernatural conspiracy of potentially apocalyptic magnitude.

The mysterious lattices of twigs were inspired by the work of Weird Tales artist Lee Brown Coye, who illustrated two Carcosa Press volumes which Wagner edited: Manly Wade Wellman's Worse Things Waiting and Hugh B. Cave's Murgunstrumm and Others (the latter volume appeared some years after "Sticks" was written).

"Sticks" was also the inspiration for the lattice stick structures in the HBO show True Detective.

Adaptations
In the mid-1980s, "Sticks" was adapted for The Cabinet of Dr. Fritz, a 1984–85 binaural radio drama series produced by Thomas Lopez and the ZBS Foundation for NPR.  Some characters from the short story are excised entirely, while a love interest for Leverett is introduced as a foil. Steven Keats provides the voice of Colin Leverett, while Laura Esterman and Bill Raymond perform as Carol and George/Althol respectively. The soundtrack is composed by Tim Clark. Samples from this episode were used in the song "Stairs and Flowers" by Canadian electro-industrial band Skinny Puppy, on their 1986 album, Mind: The Perpetual Intercourse.

In June 2019, British synthwave band Kish Kollektiv released an imaginary soundtrack concept album broadly inspired by "Sticks", entitled Dwellers in the Earth.

Critics have noted similarities between the plot of "Sticks" and that of the film The Blair Witch Project (1999).

References

1974 short stories
Cthulhu Mythos short stories
Fantasy short stories
Works originally published in American magazines
Works originally published in horror fiction magazines
Works originally published in fantasy fiction magazines